Acanthuriformes is an order of ray-finned fishes, part of the Percomorpha clade. Some authorities place the fishes in the order within the Acanthuriformes in the suborders Acanthuroidea and Percoidea of the order Perciformes.

Classification
The Acanthuriformes as defined in the 5th edition of Fishes of the World is set out as follows: 

 Order Acanthuriformes
 Suborder Sciaenoidei Gill, 1872
 Family Emmelichthyidae Poey, 1867 (Rovers)
 Family Sciaenidae Cuvier, 1829 (Drums)
 Suborder Acanthuroidei
 Family Luvaridae Gill, 1885 (Luvar)
 Family Zanclidae Bleeker, 1876 (Moorish angels)
 †Family Massalongiidae Tyler & Bannikov, 2005
 Family Acanthuridae Bonaparte, 1835 (Surgeonfishes) 
 Subfamily Nasinae Fowler & Bean, 1929
 Subfamily Acanthurinae Bonaparte, 1835
 Tribe Prionurini J.L.B. Smith, 1966
 Tribe Zebrasomini Winterbottom, 1993
 Tribe Acanthurini Bonaparte, 1835

References

Percomorpha
Ray-finned fish orders